The Limpopo Championship is a golf tournament on the Sunshine Tour played at Euphoria Golf & Lifestyle Estate in Modimolle, Limpopo province, South Africa.

It was first played in March 2019 with prize money of R1,500,000. J. C. Ritchie won the event at the first hole of a playoff with Steve Surry. The second edition was played in early 2020. It was co-sanctioned with the Challenge Tour and had increased prize money of US$250,000 (R 3,500,000). Because of the large field, a second venue, Koro Creek Bushveld Golf Estate, was used for the first two rounds. Ritchie retained the title in 2020, beating Wilco Nienaber by two strokes. The 2021 event was played at Euphoria in April and was again co-sanctioned with the Challenge Tour with prize money of R3,000,000. It was won in a four-man playoff by Brandon Stone, who made a birdie at the first extra hole.

Winners

Notes

References

External links
Coverage at the Sunshine Tour's official website
Coverage at the Challenge Tour's official website

Sunshine Tour events
Former Challenge Tour events
Golf tournaments in South Africa
Sport in Limpopo